Gorg Baghi (also Romanized as Gorg Bāghī; also known as Bāgh Garā, Gar-i-Bāgh, Gar-i-Bāqi, Gorg Bāgh, and Kūr-e Bāgh) is a village in Alishar Rural District, Kharqan District, Zarandieh County, Markazi Province, Iran. At the 2006 census, its population was 221, in 52 families.

References 

Populated places in Zarandieh County